Cacozelia pemphusalis is a species of snout moth in the genus Cacozelia. It was described by Herbert Druce in 1899. It is found in the southern part of the United States, including Arizona.

References

Epipaschiinae
Moths described in 1899